Steve Little (born July 1, 1972) is an American actor, comedian and writer, best known for his roles on the shows Camp Lazlo, The Marvelous Misadventures of Flapjack, Eastbound & Down, Adventure Time, The Grinder, and Haters Back Off. He also used to co-star on the Adult Swim series Neon Joe, Werewolf Hunter.

Career
Little was a member of The Groundlings, an improvisational and sketch comedy troupe based in Los Angeles. Joe Murray encountered Little and asked Little if he was interested in being a voice actor and decided that Little matched the "Dung Beetle" characters Chip and Skip.

Following a period working as both writer and actor, he starred in the 2011 Todd Rohal film The Catechism Cataclysm. Little also wrote and starred in a Nickelodeon pilot called Cosmic Signals. He has also voiced characters such as Dr. Barber, and Lolly Poopdeck on The Marvelous Misadventures of Flapjack, as well as The Duke of Nuts, Turtle Princess, Abracadaniel and Peppermint Butler on the Cartoon Network series Adventure Time.

Little plays the recurring character Stevie Janowski, a middle-school band teacher who idolizes and serves as the personal assistant of the main character, Kenny Powers, on the HBO series Eastbound & Down. He hadn't met Danny McBride or the showrunners before auditioning for the role, but the family atmosphere was "very welcoming." After being cast, Little based some of Stevie's mannerisms and emotions on people he went to high school with.

Subsequent to his exposure on Eastbound & Down, he went on to make appearances in series such as 30 Rock and The Office, and Romantic Encounters.

Little co-starred in two of Quentin Dupieux's surreal films, Wrong and Wrong Cops. In 2014, he starred in short film Rat Pack Rat, which won jury award at 2014 Sundance Film Festival. In 2015, he starred as Cleve Menu in the Adult Swim show Neon Joe, Werewolf Hunter.

From 2016 to 2017 he acted in the Netflix series Haters Back Off as Miranda Sings' uncle Jim alongside Colleen Ballinger and Angela Kinsey. During that same year he portrayed the character of George in the comedy horror film Another Evil.

Voice acting

References

External links

1972 births
Living people
American male comedians
American male film actors
American male television actors
American male television writers
American male voice actors
American television writers
Place of birth missing (living people)
Primetime Emmy Award winners
21st-century American comedians
21st-century American screenwriters
21st-century American male writers